On the Trail of the Bremen Town Musicians is a 1973 Soviet animated film directed by Vasily Livanov. It was made as a sequel to The Bremen Town Musicians. Zherzdeva & Gorokhov, who voiced the princess & the donkey in the first film were the only ones to reprise their roles.

Plot
The King, wanting for his daughter to be found and returned to his castle, hires Detective to carry out the task. He successfully kidnaps and returns Princess back to the kingdom, but Troubadour and his animal friends Bremen Town Musicians hurry to release her. Disguised as foreign rock singers, the group distracts the King and the Detective, while Troubadour rescues his love and together they escape once again.

Cast 

 Muslim Magomayev - Troubadour, Detective and Atamansha
 Elmira Zherzdeva - Princess
 Gennady Gladkov - The King
 Anatoly Gorokhov, Leonid Berger and vocal ensemble - Bremen Town Musicians, the Robbers and the guards

See also
History of Russian animation

References

External links

On the Trail of the Bremen Town Musicians at Animator.ru
Cartoon with English subtitles (var2)

1973 films
Films scored by Gennady Gladkov
Films based on The Town Musicians of Bremen
Films directed by Vasily Livanov
Russian sequel films
Soviet animated films
Soyuzmultfilm
Sung-through_musical films